Scott Robert Patterson (born June 20, 1979 in Oakdale, Pennsylvania) is an American former professional baseball pitcher. He played in Major League Baseball (MLB) for the New York Yankees and San Diego Padres.

Early life
Patterson grew up in the Pittsburgh suburb of Oakdale, Pennsylvania, where his dad and brother currently live. He attended West Allegheny High School where he still holds the single season strikeout record. Following high school, he attended Allegany College of Maryland in Cumberland, Maryland. Afterward, he attended West Virginia State, where, during his senior season he threw a perfect game and was also awarded the 2002 WVIAC Pitcher of the Year.

Career
Patterson was re-signed by the New York Yankees as a free agent on November 16, 2007, after spending most of the previous two seasons with their Double-A affiliate, the Trenton Thunder. Prior to spending time in the Yankees organization, he was in the Frontier League, an independent baseball league, for 4 seasons.

On June 1, Patterson was called up to the major leagues for the first time and made his major league debut for the Yankees that day in a loss to the Minnesota Twins. Patterson was optioned back to the minors on June 3, 2008 after only pitching in one game. He was designated for assignment on September 8, 2008 and was claimed off waivers by the San Diego Padres three days later. He would end up pitching in three games for the Padres in September. On August 20, 2009, Patterson was traded to the Oakland Athletics for cash considerations.

On January 7, 2010, Patterson signed a minor league contract with the Boston Red Sox. On August 5, 2012, Patterson joined the New York Mets organization and was assigned to Triple-A Buffalo. He was released on August 16.

On March 31, 2016, Patterson signed with the New Britain Bees of the Atlantic League of Professional Baseball.

He retired from playing after the 2016 season and was named pitching coach for the Lancaster Barnstormers.

References

External links

Official Website: scottpattersonpitching.com

1979 births
Living people
People from Oakdale, Pennsylvania
Águilas del Zulia players
Baseball players at the 2011 Pan American Games
Baseball coaches from Pennsylvania
Baseball players from Pennsylvania
Buffalo Bisons (minor league) players
Cardenales de Lara players
American expatriate baseball players in Venezuela
Gateway Grizzlies players
Jackson Generals (Southern League) players
Lancaster Barnstormers players
Major League Baseball pitchers
Minor league baseball coaches
New Britain Bees players
New York Yankees players
Pan American Games medalists in baseball
Pan American Games silver medalists for the United States
Portland Beavers players
Sacramento River Cats players
San Diego Padres players
Scranton/Wilkes-Barre Yankees players
Tacoma Rainiers players
Trenton Thunder players
United States national baseball team players
West Virginia State Yellow Jackets baseball players
Medalists at the 2011 Pan American Games
American expatriate baseball players in Italy